William More (by 1511 – 1568 or later) was an English politician.

He was a Member (MP) of the Parliament of England for Derby in November 1554 and 1563.

References

Year of death missing
English MPs 1554–1555
English MPs 1563–1567
Year of birth uncertain